Am grünen Strand der Spree (On the Verdant Shores of the River Spree) was a five-part German television movie which first aired in 1960. It was based on a novel by Hans Scholz and has been called a Straßenfeger in German, a television program that was watched by so many, the streets (Straßen) were empty (gefegt, swept clean). It was produced by German broadcaster Nord- und Westdeutscher Rundfunkverband (NWRV) in Cologne, Germany. On April 29, 2009, the film version was released on five DVDs with the five-part SWF radio play as bonus material on MP3 CD.

Synopsis 
The story takes place in postwar Berlin, divided into zones of occupation. Five friends meet and share their experiences during World War II.

Cast (partial) 
 Bum Krüger as Fritz Georg Hesselbarth
 Werner Lieven as Hans Schott
 Malte Jaeger as Hans-Joachim Lepsius
 Günter Pfitzmann as Bob Arnoldis
 Peter Pasetti
 Elisabeth Müller
 Anneli Granget

See also
List of German television series

References

External links
 

1960 German television series debuts
1960 German television series endings
Television shows set in Berlin
German-language television shows
Das Erste original programming
Films directed by Fritz Umgelter